Innerdownie is a hill in the Ochil Hills range, part of the Central Lowlands in Scotland. It is the most easterly Donald in the range and, at 610 m (2001 ft), the lowest Donald. Commonly, ascents begin from Glensherup and Glendevon to the north and northeast respectively, often ascended as part of a round of the neighbouring hills.

References

Donald mountains
Mountains and hills of Perth and Kinross